is an airport located five miles south of Stevensville, Maryland, United States, on the Chesapeake Bay.

History 
The airport was founded by Nathan "Bill" Morris on a potato patch located on Kent Island. He built a hangar with a small single family home above, creating one of the first hangar-homes in the country. Morris was one of the world's oldest active pilots later in life, flying at 98 years of age.

The residential airpark is lined with 14 homes that share access to the grass runway.

References

External links 
YouTube video of landing at Kentmorr

Airports in Maryland
Transportation buildings and structures in Queen Anne's County, Maryland
Airports established in 1945
1945 establishments in Maryland